Old Byland and Scawton is a civil parish in the Ryedale district, in the county of North Yorkshire, England. The parish includes the villages of Old Byland and Scawton. At the 2001 census, the civil parish was accounted for with the parish of Cold Kirby, and had a population of 232, which had dropped to 205 at the 2011 census. In 2015, North Yorkshire County Council estimated the population of the Old Byland and Scawton Parish to be 120. The parish touches Boltby, Byland with Wass, Cold Kirby, Hawnby, Kilburn High and Low, Oldstead, Rievaulx and Sproxton. There are 16 listed buildings in Old Byland and Scawton.

History
The parish was formed on 1 April 1986 from "Old Byland" and "Scawton".

References

Civil parishes in North Yorkshire
Ryedale